William Birch (1887–1968) was an English footballer. He played for Blackpool, Nottingham Forest, Reading, Grimsby Town,  Gainsborough Trinity and Rotherham County.

References

1887 births
1968 deaths
People from Rainford
English footballers
Blackpool F.C. players
Nottingham Forest F.C. players
Reading F.C. players
Grimsby Town F.C. players
Gainsborough Trinity F.C. players
Rotherham County F.C. players
Eccles United F.C. players
Association football outside forwards